The Luxembourg Open is an annual badminton tournament held in Luxembourg. The tournament is part of the Badminton Europe tournament series and is leveled in BWF International Series. The inaugural edition was held in 2022.

Winners

Performances by nation

References 

Badminton tournaments in Luxembourg
Sports competitions in Luxembourg